Cosmophasis ambonensis is a species of jumping spider described in 2021. The  male holotype (HC-AM1m) is missing the left pedipalp, and was collected on gravel near food stands in Ambon Island.

Etymology 
The specific epithet "ambonensis" refers to the fact that it is only known present on Ambon Island.

References 

Salticidae
Spiders described in 2021
Fauna of Indonesia